Steve Halloran (born June 29, 1948) is an American politician who has served in the Nebraska Legislature from the 33rd district since 2017.

Career
In the late 1980s and early 1990s, Halloran was president of the Nebraska branch of the National Farmers Organization. In this role, Halloran was critical of US President Ronald Reagan's agricultural policy as being to favorable too ranchers and food processors and unfavorable to grain-growing farmers. Halloran was elected president of the NFO in December 1991. In that position, he advocated farmer cooperation and the development of domestic grain consumption over grain exporting. By 2006, however, Halloran had retired from farming and was co-owner of a HuHot Mongolian Grill restaurant in Billings, Montana.

Politics
In 2016, Halloran was elected to the Nebraska State Senate.

Education
As a state senator, Halloran has been particularly critical of education policy. In February 2017, he proposed a bill that would remove funding from the Nebraska Master Teacher program. In this, Halloran has frequently been allied with state senator Steve Erdman. Along with Erdman, in April 2017 Halloran was one of three senators that opposed new rules requiring Nebraska schools to expand accommodation to students with children including breastfeeding accommodations. In August 2017, the University of Nebraska (UN) became embroiled in a controversy when a graduate student and an undergraduate student entered into a political argument related to the undergraduate's involvement in Turning Point USA, a conservative education advocacy organization. After a video of the event was released, Erdman, Halloran, and state senator Tom Brewer were outspoken in criticism of the grad student and UNL that it was hostile to conservative viewpoints. A group of 70 UN faculty accused the senators and Nebraska governor Pete Ricketts of being politically motivated in their criticism and seeking to damage the university. The graduate student lost funding as a result of the dispute, a move that was heavily criticized by AAUP, the faculty Union. The senators proposed a bill that would restrict the ability of the university to govern itself with regards to speech issues. They also called for an outside agency to study campus attitudes towards conservatives. The university suggested using Gallup for this study, but the senators felt that Gallup could not be unbiased and insisted that the Foundation for Individual Rights in Education (FIRE) be used instead, although FIRE would determine the graduate student was within her rights and should not have lost her position. The senators fight with the University continued for much of 2018. In March, they proposed an amendment to strip $17 million of funding from UNL, which ultimately failed. In October, Halloran claimed that the university sought to indoctrinate students to become liberal at a panel put on by the Academic Freedom Coalition of Nebraska.

Other
Outside of Education, Halloran is an outspoken advocate of his views. He called for an amendment to the US Constitution requiring federal fiscal restraint in January 2019, opposed increasing tipped workers minimum wage in March 2019, and in October 2021 called for a law opposing vaccine mandates during the Covid-19 pandemic.

References

1948 births
Living people
Republican Party Nebraska state senators
21st-century American politicians
People from Hastings, Nebraska